Želino is a municipality in the northwestern part of North Macedonia. Želino is also the name of the village where the municipal seat is found. This municipality is part of the Polog Statistical Region.

Geography
The municipality borders Jegunovce Municipality to the north, the City of Skopje to the east, Tetovo Municipality to the northwest, Brvenica Municipality to the west, Sopište Municipality to the southeast, and Makedonski Brod Municipality to the south.

The municipality includes the Kozjak Hydro Power Plant which created the associated artificial lake, the largest such lake in the country.

Demographics
This municipality has 18,988 inhabitants, according to the 2021 census. Ethnic groups in the municipality:

References

External links
Official website

 
Polog Statistical Region
Municipalities of North Macedonia
Albanian communities in North Macedonia